Mikhail Mikhailovich Tetyaev ( 11(23) September 1882, Nizhny Novgorod – 11 October 1956, Leningrad) was a Soviet tectonic geologist.

The wrinkle ridge Dorsa Tetyaev on the Moon is named after Mikhail Tetyaev.

Soviet geologists
1882 births
1956 deaths